Stanley J. "Dick" Williams (19 July 1891 – 25 May 1966) was an Australian rules footballer who played with St Kilda in the Victorian Football League (VFL). He was the curator of Adelaide Oval from 1939 to 1953.

Williams, a half back, started his career at North Adelaide in 1910 and played with them until 1919. He joined St Kilda in 1920 and the following year, also Charlie Ricketts retired mid-season, was appointed club captain. It would be his only season as captain of St Kilda. He returned to North Adelaide in 1926 but was comeback was brief.

In 1939, following the death of Adelaide Oval curator Albert Wright, Williams was appointed as his replacement. He had been previously working as a greenkeeper at a bowling club, which was attached to the oval. Due to ill health, Williams retired in 1953.

References

External links
 

1891 births
1966 deaths
Australian rules footballers from South Australia
St Kilda Football Club players
North Adelaide Football Club players
Cricket curators